= Nishan Ghimire =

Nepalese music and movie editor and director (born 1985)

- निशान घिमिरे
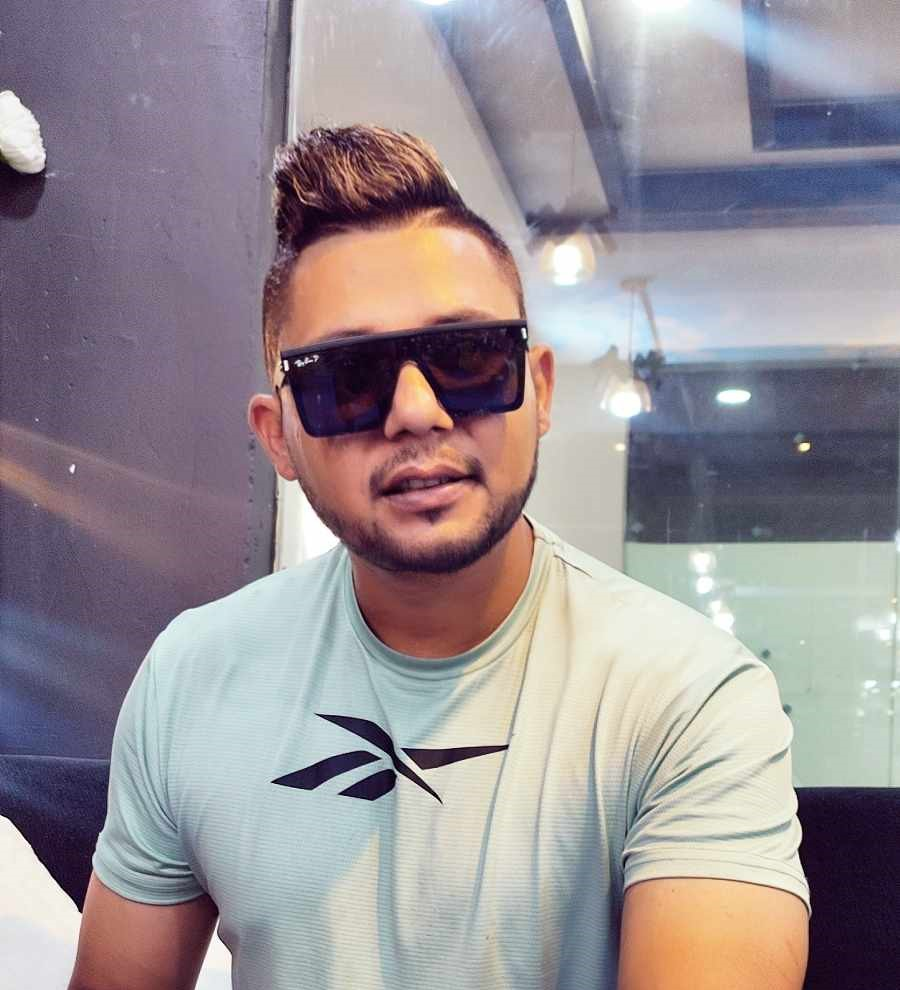
- Born: 15 November 1983 (age 42); Kathmandu Nepal
- Occupations: Movie and Music Video Editor, Director
- Years active: 2002 - Present
- Known for: Movie and Music Video Editor, Director

Nishan Ghimire (Nepali:निशान घिमिरे ) is a music video editor and director from Nepal. He was born on 15 November 1983 in Kathmandu Nepal. He has edited more than 6000 music video. He was the editor of Nepali movie Gurudakshina.

== Career ==
Ghimire started his career in 2004 with his first music video Jane Mayalu as editor. Along with music he has edited movies: Gurudakshina and Merokatha. He has directed over three hundred music videos. Pilayo sathile and Salko Patko Tapari were some popular examples.

== Recognition ==
He has won several awards:

- Bindiwasini music award
- Himalayan music video award.

== Awards ==
SN	Award Title	Award Category	Notable Work	Result	ref
1	SPARSH MUSIC VIDEO AWARD 2023(BS)	Best Music Video Editor of the Year	Ajambari Pirati	Won	
2	HIMALAYAN INTERNATIONAL AWARD 2022(AD)	Best Music Video Editor of the Year	Dohori ko Raja	Won	
3	IMAGE AWARD - 2018(AD)	Best Music Video Director of the Year	Don't Kill Me	Won	
4	MUSIC KHABAR AWARD 2016(AD)	Best Music Video Editor of the Year	Tyo Chhutne Din	Won	

== Notable work ==
Song List
SN	Song name	Credit	ref
1	Pilayo sathile		
2	salko patko tapari		
3	Bal Garera Tyo Man	Director	
4	Jaula Relaima	Editor	
5	Timi Fulyeu Katai	Editor	
6	Mero Yo Chokho Maya	Editor	
7	Hamro paryo Rupa	Editor	
8	Birano Saharma	Director	
9	Siriri Batas	Director/Editor	
10	Yo dlima Name lekhne	Director	
11	Mero Maya	Director	
12	Nachau Gau jhamau	Director	
13	Timimai Haraya	Director	
14	Laideu na Mayale	Editor	

Movie List
SN	Movie name	Credit	ref
1	Gurudakshina	Editor	
2	Merokatha	Editor	
3	Muna	Editor	
4	Signature	Editor	
